Bill Mosby (born William Harry Mosby on 24 January 1898, Sioux City, Iowa)  was a portrait artist and an important American teacher of fine arts.

Life and work
William H Mosby was a professor of art at the American Academy of Art in Chicago, a painter, and illustrator.

Mosby grew up in Iowa. After serving in the United States Army in War World I, he attended the Chicago Academy of Fine Arts. In 1924, he went to Europe and enrolled in the Royal Academy of Fine Arts in Belgium. In Europe, he learned classical technique which he later shared with his students at the American Academy of Art in Chicago. He taught there from 1930 until his death in 1964 with the exception of a scholarship he was awarded at The National Higher Institute of Fine Arts in Antwerp, Belgium and to serve in the U.S. Navy during World War II.

An exceptional painter, he exhibited with the Art Institute of Chicago in 1934 and 1936. He also did illustration work for such companies as Mars Candy, Goodrich Tires and Chrysler. A mural by Mosby is in the St Matthew's Episcopal Church in Chicago.

Students Include : Richard Schmid, Gil Elvgren, Ted Smuskiewcz, Bill Parks, Howard Terpning, James J. Ingwersen and others.

Teacher: Charles Hermans and Students of Louis Gallait

References

1898 births
1964 deaths
20th-century American painters
American male painters
American illustrators
20th-century American male artists